The hertz (symbol: Hz) is the SI derived unit of frequency.

Hertz may also refer to:

People
 Hertz (name), a German surname that has also been used as a given name.
 Heinrich Hertz, (1857–1894), German physicist after whom the unit of frequency was named

Places
 16761 Hertz, a minor planet
 Hertz (crater), on Moon

Arts and entertainment
 "Hertz", a song by Amyl and the Sniffers from their 2021 album Comfort to Me
 "Hertz", a song by Eden from his 2020 album No Future

Companies and organizations
 The Hertz Corporation, American car and equipment rental service
 Hertz Car Sales division
 Hertz Foundation, a charitable foundation in Livermore, California
 50Hertz Transmission GmbH, one of the 4 electric transmission operators in Germany

See also
 Herz (disambiguation)
 Hurts (disambiguation)
 Franck–Hertz experiment, fundamental physics
 Herts, an abbreviation of Hertfordshire